Upuigma-tepui, also known as El Castillo, is a tepui in Bolívar state, Venezuela. A relatively isolated peak, both it and nearby Angasima-tepui lie just south of the vast Chimantá Massif, from which they are separated by the Río Aparurén valley. Upuigma-tepui is situated entirely within the bounds of Canaima National Park.

Its highly uneven summit is dotted with numerous rock towers and deep crevasses which make it practically impossible to traverse. Summit vegetation is predominantly in the form of tepui scrub and dense stands of herbaceous plants.

The first documented people to climb Upuigma-tepui were John Arran, Ivan Calderon and Steve Backshall, in 2007. Upon reaching the summit, they discovered several previously unknown species of plants and animals.

See also
 Distribution of Heliamphora

References

Further reading

  Brewer-Carías, C. (2010). El origen de los tepuyes: los hijos de las estrellas. Río Verde 3: 54–69.
  La Cruz, L. (February–April 2010). Iván Calderon y su mundo vertical. Río Verde 1: 98–115.

Tepuis of Venezuela
Mountains of Venezuela
Mountains of Bolívar (state)